The IBM ThinkPad T20 series was a series of notebook computers introduced in May 2000 by IBM as the successor of the 600 series and the first model of the T-series which exists today under Lenovo ownership. Four models were produced, the T20, T21, T22, and T23; the series was succeeded in May 2002 by the ThinkPad T30, but was produced until July 2003.

Features
The T20 series succeeded the 600 series, adding new features such as S-Video output, an Ethernet port, and the UltraBay 2000 hot-swappable bay. The graphics card was upgraded from the 4MB NeoMagic 256ZX which was used in the 600X, to an 8MB S3 Savage (16MB on T23 models) which was capable of rendering 3D graphics in hardware. The ThinkPad T23 was also the first ThinkPad laptop model to offer an optional WiFi connection via a Mini-PCI card, using wireless antennas which were built into the lid on select upper-end models.

The T20 series originally shipped with either Windows 98, Windows 2000, or Linux, with later T23 models shipping with Windows XP.  All T20 models were capable of running Windows 3.x, Windows 95, Windows NT 4.0, OS/2 Warp 4, or Windows Me as well as various Linux distributions.  Additionally, the T23 was capable of running Windows Vista or Windows 7, if equipped with at least 512MB of memory.

One common problem of the earlier T20 series was a hardware defect which caused the machine to suddenly stop working and begin blinking the hard drive and power indicators.  The machine would not power on.  This became known as the "Blink of Death".  In addition, on some T23 models, the rear memory slot could fail, rendering the machine only able to use up to 512MB of memory, rather than 1GB.  Another common issue with the T23 was that one of the coils, near the CPU, could break off the motherboard due to cold solder joints.  This caused multiple issues, including the inability to boot or hard lockup/freeze.

Models
ThinkPad T20 - First model shipped, featured a Pentium III at 650, 700 or 750 MHz, all with SpeedStep technology. This model shipped with either a 13.3" XGA TFT or 14.1" XGA TFT display, and shipped with an external floppy drive, a swappable CD-ROM or DVD-ROM drive, and a choice of a 6GB, 12GB, or a 20GB hard drive. The T20 also had optional Ethernet (consumer installable via mini-PCI on all models), one USB 1.1 port, PC Card Slot, and an S-Video output as standard features, and shipped with 128MB of RAM (upgradeable to 512MB using PC100 SODIMMs)
ThinkPad T21 - Featuring an upgraded Pentium III processor at either 750 MHz, 800 MHz, or 850 MHz, the T21 featured either a 13.3" XGA TFT, 14.1" XGA TFT, or a new 14.1" SXGA+ TFT display (exclusive to 850 MHz models). This model shipped with a swappable CD-ROM or DVD-ROM drive, and a choice of a 10GB, 20GB or 32GB hard drive. The T21 features either a mini-PCI modem card or an Ethernet/modem combo card, one USB 1.1 port, PC Card Slot, and 128MB of RAM standard (upgradeable to 512MB using PC100 SODIMMs).
ThinkPad T22 - Featuring an upgraded Pentium III processor at either 800 MHz, 900 MHz, or 1.00 GHz, the T22 featured either a 13.3" XGA TFT, 14.1" XGA TFT, or 14.1" SXGA+ TFT display as standard. This model shipped a mini-PCI modem card or an Ethernet/modem combo card, one USB 1.1 port, PC Card Slot, a swappable CD-ROM or DVD-ROM drive, either a 10GB, 20GB or 32GB hard drive, and 128MB or 256MB of RAM standard (upgradeable to 512MB using PC100 SODIMMs).
ThinkPad T23 - The final model of the T20 series, featuring the new Tualatin Pentium III-M at either 866 MHz, 1.00 GHz, 1.13 GHz, or 1.20 GHz (all with SpeedStep technology) and either a 13.3" XGA TFT, 14.1" XGA TFT, or 14.1" SXGA+ TFT display as standard. This model shipped with 2 USB 1.1 ports rather than only one, a 15GB to 60GB hard drive, a Mini-PCI Modem or Wireless card (on select models), a CD-ROM, DVD-ROM, CD-RW or combo (CD-RW/DVD) drive, and either 128MB or 256MB of RAM standard (upgradeable to 1GB using PC133 SODIMMs).

Comparison

See also
 ThinkPad T Series

References

ThinkPad T20
T20 series